Niqmaddu II was the second ruler and king of Ugarit, an ancient Syrian citystate in northwestern Syria, reigning c. 1350–1315 BC (or possibly c. 1380–1346 BC) and succeeding his less known father, Ammittamru I. He took his name from the earlier Amorite ruler Niqmaddu, meaning "Addu has vindicated" to strengthen the supposed origins of his Ugaritic dynasty is the Amorites.

Though the exact date of his accession to the throne of Ugarit is unknown, he might be a contemporary of both Akhenaten and Tutankhamun the Hittite ruler Shuppiluliuma I, and was a vassal of the latter. He had good relations with Egypt, and conceded to the Amorites in a dispute over the Shiyannu region early in his reign. He commissioned the Baal cycle about the god Haddu/Ba'al, and had a son, Niqmepa.

In EA 49 (EA = El Amarna), Niqmaddu II apparently requested an Egyptian physician and two palace attendants from "Cush", the Egyptian envoy to Ugarit.

He is identified in Syrian on an alabaster vase along with a woman in Egyptian court dress, however, the name of the woman in the vase, if ever indicated, is not preserved and is mentioned in the Baal cycle as King nqmd. He was succeeded briefly by Ar-Halba.

References

Ugaritic kings
Amarna letters writers
14th-century BC rulers
14th-century BC people